Courrier d'Ethiopie ('Courier of Ethiopia') was a French language weekly newspaper published from Addis Ababa 1913–1936. The first issue came out on August 2, 1913. Courrier d'Ethiopie was the first foreign-language newspaper in Ethiopia. The newspaper was founded by Alexis Desvages, who also served as its editor until 1924. Soon after its foundation the newspaper reached a circulation of around 700. Initially all material in the newspaper was in French (i.e. Roman font), but soon advertisements in Amharic and, later, notices in Amharic began to appear in Courrier d'Ethiopie.

Publication was discontinued 1914–1917, when Desvages was doing military service.

References

1913 establishments in Ethiopia
1936 disestablishments in Ethiopia
French-language newspapers published in Africa
Defunct newspapers published in Ethiopia
Mass media in Addis Ababa
Weekly newspapers published in Ethiopia
Newspapers established in 1913
Publications disestablished in 1936